Margrethia is a genus of bristlemouths.

Species
There are currently two recognized species in this genus:
 Margrethia obtusirostra Jespersen & Tåning, 1919 (Bighead portholefish)
 Margrethia valentinae Parin, 1982

References

Gonostomatidae
Taxa named by Åge Vedel Tåning
Marine fish genera